Deh Bala (also Romanized as Deh Bālā and Deh-e Bālā) is a village in the Chahar Gonbad Rural District, Central District, Sirjan County, Kerman Province, Iran. At the 2006 census, its population was 13, in 6 families.

References 

Populated places in Sirjan County